Diloma bicanaliculatum, common name the knobbed top shell, is a species of small sea snail, a marine gastropod mollusk, in the family Trochidae, the top snails. The size of the shell varies between 10 mm and 20 mm.

Distribution
This marine shell is endemic to New Zealand and occurs off North Island, South Island and Stewart Island. A subspecies, Diloma bicanaliculata Lenoir, was once used for specimens between Cook Strait and Stewart Island. The subspecies is not listed on the World Register of Marine Species, so it may no longer be valid.

References

 Powell A. W. B., New Zealand Mollusca, William Collins Publishers Ltd, Auckland, New Zealand 1979 
 Willan, R.C.; Marshall, B.A.; Climo, F.M.; Cernohorsky, W.O. 1980: Rectification of nomenclature for Melagraphia aethiops (Gmelin) and Diloma bicanaliculata (Dunker) (Mollusca: Trochidae). New Zealand Journal of Marine and Freshwater Research 14: 413-415
 Donald K.M., Kennedy M. & Spencer H.G. (2005) The phylogeny and taxonomy of austral monodontine topshells (Mollusca: Gastropoda: Trochidae), inferred from DNA sequences. Molecular Phylogenetics and Evolution 37: 474-483

bicanaliculatum
Gastropods of New Zealand
Gastropods described in 1844